Victorias, officially the City of Victorias, is a 4th class component city in the province of Negros Occidental, Philippines. According to the 2020 census, it has a population of 90,101 people.

Victorias is notable for the St. Joseph the Worker Chapel, which was declared as an Important Cultural Property of the Philippines in December 2015.

It is also the site of Victorias Milling Company, the world's largest integrated sugar mill, sitting on a  compound that makes it the Philippine's largest sugar refinery.

Victorias City also serves as the access point to the Northern Negros Natural Park, popular among hikers visiting Mount Mandalagan and Mount Silay.

Geography

Barangays
Victorias City is politically subdivided into 26 barangays.

Climate

Demographics

The people in the city speak the Hiligaynon language (often called Ilonggo). Filipino and English are generally understood.

Economy

Religion
Notable religions include:
Roman Catholicism
United Pentecostal Church International
Baptist Bible Fellowship International
Seventh-day Adventist Church
The Church of Jesus Christ of Latter-day Saints in the Philippines
Iglesia ni Cristo
Jehovah's Witnesses
Apostolic Pentecostalism
Evangelical Protestantism
Philippine Independent Church
IKTHUS

Churches
Notable churches include:
 St. Joseph the Worker Chapel, also known as the Angry Christ Church
Ultrafidian Center
The Church of Jesus Christ of Latter-day Saints Victorias City
Our Lady of Victory Parish

St. Joseph the Worker Chapel

Within the Victorias Milling Company's complex is the St. Joseph the Worker Chapel, a masterpiece considered the first example of modern sacral architecture in the Philippines and raised to the status of Important Cultural Property by the National Museum of the Philippines in 2015. The chapel was designed by the famous Czech Architect Antonín Raymond.

Its mural of the Angry Christ was painted by international artist Alfonso Ossorio. The mural has been featured in various publications such as Life Magazine. Its fierce, vivid colors gave the church its most known name, the "Angry Christ Church".

Festivals
The city celebrates the annual Kadalag-an Festival, a charter anniversary held on March 21, and the annual Malihaw Festival on April 26.

The city also celebrates the Kalamayan Festival every December. The word "Kalamayan" depicts what Victorias is known for, its “kalamay” or refined sugar and its sugar industry, the Victorias Milling Company.

Notable personalities

 Noven Belleza - first champion of Tawag ng Tanghalan; born in Victorias
 Alfonso A. Ossorio - Filipino-American abstract expressionist artist; though born in Manila in 1916 to a Negros Occidental family, his Angry Christ Mural is connected to Victorias City
 Albee Benitez - politician, business magnate

Education
Notable educational institutions include:
Central Philippines State University – Victorias City Campus
Don Bosco Technical Institute, Victorias
La Salle College–Victorias
Negros Occidental National Science High School
Colegio de Santa Ana de Victorias
Victorias National High School - best school in the city
Victorias Elementary School
Laura Vicuña Women Development & Training Center (Hda.Malihao, Barangay XX, Victorias City)
Jack & Jill School/Castleson High

References

External links

Victorias City profile at the official website of Negros Occidental
 [ Philippine Standard Geographic Code]
Philippine census information
Local Governance Performance Management System

Cities in Negros Occidental
Component cities in the Philippines